Skarphéðinn Guðmundsson (7 April 1930 – 20 January 2003) was an Icelandic ski jumper. He competed in the individual event at the 1960 Winter Olympics.

References

1930 births
2003 deaths
Icelandic male ski jumpers
Olympic ski jumpers of Iceland
Ski jumpers at the 1960 Winter Olympics
20th-century Icelandic people